SWMP may refer to:

 Smith & Wesson M&P, a semi-automatic pistol intended for military and police usage
 Stormwater management pond, an artificial pond used to prevent flooding
 Site waste management plan

See also
Swamp
Site Waste Management Plans Regulations 2008